Michael Richard (born July 9, 1966) is a Canadian former professional ice hockey centre who played seven games in the National Hockey League (NHL) for the Washington Capitals. From 1990 to 2007, he played hockey in Europe.

Award and honours
 Dudley "Red" Garrett Memorial Award (1987–88)
 AHL Second All-Star Team (1989–90)

External links
 

1966 births
Living people
Baltimore Skipjacks players
Binghamton Whalers players
Canadian expatriate ice hockey players in Italy
Canadian expatriate ice hockey players in Switzerland
Canadian expatriate ice hockey players in the United States
Canadian ice hockey centres
EHC Olten players
Elmira Jackals (ECHL) players
HC Milano players
Sportspeople from Scarborough, Toronto
Ice hockey people from Toronto
SC Rapperswil-Jona Lakers players
Toronto Marlboros players
Undrafted National Hockey League players
Washington Capitals players
ZSC Lions players